Violeta Yakova or Violeta Jakova (June 2, 1923 in Dupnitsa – June 18, 1944 in Radomir) was a partisan and member of the Bulgarian Communist Party. Yakova, whose nom de guerre was "Ivanka", participated in the killings of several German and  Bulgarian military officers operational, including the murder of the chief of the Bulgarian Police, Atanas Pantev and Lieutenant general Hristo Lukov. She was arrested by the police of the Bulgarian government, and in June 1944, after being injured during clashes with police in the city of Radomir, she was put to death for treason by the Bulgarian government.

Biography
Violeta Yosifovna Yakova was born into a Sephardic-Jewish family in Dupnitsa; her father, Yosef Yakov, a small trader, died before she was born. The difficult economic situation in Bulgaria after World War I led many Jewish families to migrate from relatively small towns to larger population centers, and under these circumstances, her family moved to the capital Sofia. Violeta learned sewing and was employed as a tailor's apprentice. For many young Bulgarian Jews in the late 1930s and during World War II, the rise of fascism and antisemitism, combined with the Bulgarian regime alignment with the Axis powers, furthered a commitment to left and antifascist organizations. In 1939, she joined the youth organization of the Bulgarian Communist Party. In 1942, after Bulgaria joined the Axis and signed the Tripartite Pact, Yakova joined the underground resistance. 

Many young Bulgarian Jews participated in direct actions against the government in Sofia. Together, Yakova and Anjel Vagenstein burned the Sofia Leather Jackets Factory in 1942, which produced uniforms for the German forces. Also, together with Leon Kalaora and Dano Albahara, formed a fighting cell which assassinated well-known antisemites and nazi informers. Out of these, Yakova was considered the most skilled fighter, who murdered Lieutenant General Hristo Lukov and the chief of the Bulgarian Police, Colonel Atanas Pantev. These crimes drew the attention of the Bulgarian government and at the beginning of March 1944, the Bulgarian police gathered intelligence information about the whereabouts of Yakova in her hometown of Radomir, and the police began a manhunt. Yakova was located in June and was captured after a shootout with the police, during which she was injured. She was later put to death for treason by the Bulgarian police.

Memorial
Yakova's fanaticism to communism and the circumstances of her death made her one of the symbols of the resistance against the regime in Bulgaria, and one of the heroines of the Communist movement in socialist Bulgaria. In 1970, Vulo Radev produced a movie called Черните ангели (Black Angels), whose plot is about the assassination of Bulgarian military officers by young communist partisan fighters, in which Yakova and other communist women take a central role. The Communist Party of Bulgaria erected a monument in her memory in 1971.

References

1923 births
1944 deaths
People from Dupnitsa
Bulgarian Jews
Jewish socialists
Jewish resistance members during the Holocaust
20th-century executions by Bulgaria
Bulgarian resistance members
Bulgarian assassins
Violence against women in Bulgaria
Female resistance members of World War II
Female anti-fascists
Bulgarian Sephardi Jews
Jewish women activists
Bulgarian communists